Khurshidjon Tursunov (born 5 August 1994) is a Uzbekistani swimmer. He competed in the men's 100 metre freestyle event at the 2017 World Aquatics Championships. In 2019, he was scheduled to represent Uzbekistan at the 2019 World Aquatics Championships held in Gwangju, South Korea in the men's 50 metre freestyle and men's 100 metre freestyle events. In both events he did not compete.

References

External links

1994 births
Living people
Uzbekistani male freestyle swimmers
People from Navoiy Region
Asian Games medalists in swimming
Swimmers at the 2014 Asian Games
Swimmers at the 2018 Asian Games
Medalists at the 2014 Asian Games
Asian Games bronze medalists for Uzbekistan
Swimmers at the 2020 Summer Olympics
Olympic swimmers of Uzbekistan
21st-century Uzbekistani people